Virginie Buisson (born 20 August 1969) was  a French tennis player. In 1995 Buisson played in the longest ever women's singles match at the French Open defeating Noëlle van Lottum in a 4h 7m match.

See also
Longest tennis match records

References

External links
 
 

French female tennis players
1969 births
Living people
Mediterranean Games bronze medalists for France
Mediterranean Games medalists in tennis
Competitors at the 1987 Mediterranean Games